Nagesh (born Cheyur Krishnarao Nageshwaran; (27 September 1933 – 31 January 2009) was an Indian actor, mostly remembered for his roles as a comedian in Tamil films during the 1960s. Nagesh was born in Dharapuram. He acted in over 1,000 films from 1958 to 2008, performing in a variety of roles as comedian, lead roles, supporting actor and antagonist. He has also acted in Telugu, Malayalam, Hindi and Kannada films. Nagesh's style of comedy was largely inspired by Hollywood actor Jerry Lewis. Similarities between Nagesh and Lewis earned Nagesh the sobriquet the "Jerry Lewis of India". He was also nicknamed as the King of Comedy due to his impeccable comedy timing and body language. He featured regularly in the film projects of M. G. Ramachandran and Sivaji Ganesan even at a time when there was a massive rift between the two leading actors in Tamil cinema at that time.

He has a unique distinction of sharing screen space with lead actors belonging to three generations of Tamil film industry starring with MGR and Sivaji Ganesan in 1960s; Kamal Haasan and Rajnikanth in 1980s: Vijay and Ajith in late 1990s.

He was also a fantastic dancer. The song "Kanni Nathiyoram" in the movie Neerkumizhi shows some of his comic dance skills.

Early life 
Nagesh was born as Cheyur Krishna Nageshwaran to Kannadiga Hindu parents. His parents were Krishnan Rao and Rukmani Ammal. Nagesh Was born in Dharapuram. He completed his schooling in Dharapuram. He left Dharapuram at an early age and moved to Madras city in search of a career. His roommates, the writer Vaali and actor Srikanth, later established themselves as prominent personalities in the Tamil cinema field. He worked as a clerk in the Indian Railways.

Film career

Early career 
Early in his life, he saw the Tamil play Kamba Ramayanam, enacted by his colleagues, and felt that he could do a good job. He persuaded the secretary of the railway's cultural association to give him the role of a man suffering from stomach pain. MGR, then chief guest, seeing this play, in his speech praised Nagesh for his performance. From then onwards, Nagesh played small roles in various drama troupes.

In 1958, producer Balaji spotted Nagesh and gave him his first break in a film called Manamulla Marudhaaram. The film did not do well at the box office. Moreover, Nagesh had only a small role to play in the movie.

Nagesh won critical acclaim for his performance in the 1961 movie Thayilla Pillai. But it was his 1962 hit Nenjil Or Aalayam which launched his career in the Tamil film industry. Nagesh was seen playing the lead role in Server Sundaram (1964), directed by Krishnan–Panju, adapted from a 1963 play of the same name written by the legend K. Balachander. The movie was a remarkable hit and proved to be a great turning point in his career. The song from this film "Avalukenna... Azhagiya Mugam...", written by Vaali was a big hit.

Rise to prominence 
Server Sundaram marked Nagesh's rise to prominence. The film was about a restaurant waiter, "server" Sundaram, who struggles to make ends meet.

The success of Server Sundaram ensured that Nagesh was one of the most sought-after actors in the 1960s. At the height of his career, he acted in as much as 35 movies in a single calendar year, at one time shooting six movies simultaneously. He appeared in a cameo in the 1965 mythological Thiruvilayadal, in which he portrayed the poor, simpleton temple priest Dharumi. The soliloquy which Dharmi indulges in, within the temple precincts, is regarded as one of the unforgettable scenes of Tamil cinema. He followed the success with supporting roles in films such as Kaadhalikka Neramillai, where he wants to direct a film under his own production house, Oho Productions (but until the climax he does not make a film), Anbe Vaa, Shanthi Nilayam, Pattanathil Bhootham and Vietnam Veedu. He played Mohan in Major Chandrakanth, which was a popular hit and won for its lead actor Sundararajan the nickname "Major" Sundararajan. His portrayal of the detestable pimp Vaidhy in Thillana Mohanambal was noted for the way in which Nagesh blended humour with villainy. In most of his comic films, Nagesh paired with the actress Manorama. In 1967, Nagesh acted in his first Hindi movie, Farz.

Manorama was paired with Nagesh regularly in films with M.G. Ramachandran as lead between 1960 and 1970 such as Thaali Bagyam, Vettaikaran, En Kadamai, Kanni Thai, Thayin Madiyil, Kadhal Vaganam, Chandrodhyam, Anbe Vaa, Padagotti, Panathotaam, Kaavalkaran, Kadhal Vagahnam, Vivasaaye, Thaikku Thalaimagan, Ther Thiruvizha, Thanipiravi, Thazhampoo and Thozhilali. Other directors cast the Nagesh-Manorama pair in memorable films beginning from 1962, such as Nenjil Or Aalayam, Kungumam, Rakta Thilagam, Panjavarnakilli, Navarathiri, Puthiya Paravai, Anbu Karangal, Anubhavi Raja Anubhavi, Saraswathi Sabadham, Gowri Kalyanam, Galatta Kalyanam, Ner Vazhi, Ninaivin Nindraval, Poojaikku Vandamalar, Deiva Thirumagal, Deivathin Deivam, Shanti, Thenmazhai, Aannavin Asai, Andru Kanda Mugam, Seetha, Mani Makutam, Nagamali Azhagi, Kandan Karunai, Saadu Mirandal, Thaimel Aanai, Kaalam Vellum, Annai Abirami, Thiruvarutchelvar, Karunthel Kannayiram, Kalangarai Vilakkam and Annamitta Kai. Few films where they were not paired together include Server Sundaram, Madras to Pondicherry, Thillana Mohanambaal, Thiruvarul, Bommalattam and Nanbargal.

Nagesh rose to prominence through Server Sundaram (1964) for which he received praise for his evergreen comedy performances as a server in a hotel. The film was helmed by director duo Krishnan-Panchu and the screenplay had been written by K. Balachander. It also marked the first collaboration between Nagesh and K. Balachander. Since then it led to many successful collaborations between the two.

Resurgence 

Kamal Haasan again gave a brilliant role for Nagesh in the comedy flick Michael Madana Kama Rajan. Nagesh played the dishonest secretary Avinashi, who commissions a look-alike, Kameswaran to impersonate his boss, Madan, and lend him money from Madan's account. During the shooting of Michael Madana Kama Rajan, Nagesh felt disappointed and unhappy over his role as Avinashi and had also argued with Kamal Haasan.

Nagesh had a good relationship with Kamal Haasan, with whom he had co-starred in a variety of movies between 1975 and the 2000s. Kamal Haasan cast Nagesh in most of his self-productions regularly.

Later years 
Nagesh had a series of supporting roles in the 2000s. Notable among them were those of Vijay's grandfather in Poove Unakkaga, Arjun's father in Rhythm, Pawan Kalyan's Uncle Peddhananna in Toli Prema, Madhavan's grandfather Subbuni in Minnale, Ajith Kumar's Grandfather in Poovellam Un Vasam, Father Rozario in Kadhal Kondain, Srikanth's grandfather in Bose, Silambarasan's grandfather in Saravana, Jeeva's father in Pori and Kamal Haasan's father in Vasool Raja MBBS. His handling of these roles gained him considerable appreciation from the public.

Nagesh acted in Tamil films till a few months before his death in 2009. Notable among some of his later movies were Panchathanthiram, Vasool Raja MBBS, Imsai Arasan 23m Pulikesi and his last appearance, Dasavathaaram.
However, an animated version of him was seen in the 2014 performance capture film Kochadaiiyaan.

Awards 

 1974 — Kalaimamani 
 1994 — National Film Award for Best Supporting Actor for Nammavar
 1994 — Tamil Nadu State Film Award Special Prize for Nammavar
 1995 — Filmfare Lifetime Achievement Award – South

Death 
Nagesh was a chain smoker and a heavy drinker. However, he gradually gave up these habits when he was dangerously ill during the period 1978–1982. His health began to decline in late 2008 due to progressive heart ailments. In November 2008, his health conditions further deteriorated when he slipped and fell down at his home which also resulted in a severe head injury. He died on 31 January 2009 at the age of 75 due to diabetes and a heart ailment.

Partial filmography

1950s

1960s

1970s

1980s

1990s

2000s

2010s

Director

References

External links 

 
  in The Hindu

Indian male film actors
Tamil comedians
Telugu comedians
1930s births
2009 deaths
Kannada male actors
Male actors in Tamil cinema
Male actors in Kannada cinema
Male actors in Malayalam cinema
Best Supporting Actor National Film Award winners
Tamil Nadu State Film Awards winners
Indian male comedians
People from Tiruppur district
20th-century Indian male actors
21st-century Indian male actors
Male actors from Tamil Nadu
Male actors in Hindi cinema
Male actors in Telugu cinema
20th-century comedians
Madhva Brahmins